Christopher Wordsworth may refer to:

 Christopher Wordsworth (divine) (1774–1846), English divine and scholar
Christopher Wordsworth (1807–1885), English bishop in the Anglican Church and intellectual, son of the above
 Christopher Wordsworth (liturgiologist) (1848–1938), English liturgiologist and author, son of the above